Eduard "Edu" Neumann (5 June 1911 – 9 August 2004) was a Luftwaffe officer and commanded the Jagdgeschwader 27 ‘Afrika’ during the North African Campaign from 1941 to 1943.

The day after scoring his first (World War II) victory during the opening phase of the Battle of Britain, a RAF No. 236 Squadron RAF Blenheim off the coast of Cherbourg on the 20 July 1940, he was appointed Gruppenkommandeur of I./JG 27.
After a brief participation In the Invasion of Yugoslavia, in April 1941 the unit moved to Ain-el Gazala, Libya, North Africa on 18 April 1941. He received the German Cross in Gold on 11 May 1942 as Hauptmann and Gruppenkommandeur I./JG 27.

On 8 June 1942 he was promoted to Major and Geschwaderkommodore of JG 27, which he successfully led until 22 April 1943 when he joined the Staff of General der Jagdflieger. In March 1943 Neumann was promoted to Oberstleutnant (Lieutenant Colonel), and later in 1944 to Oberst (Colonel). Neumann finished the war as the Commander of Fighter Forces in Northern Italy.

After the war Neumann worked as a technical consultant on the Hans-Joachim Marseille biographical film, Der Stern von Afrika, (The Star of Africa), directed by Alfred Weidenmann and starring Joachim Hansen as Marseille.

References
Citations

Bibliography

 
 
 
 

1911 births
2004 deaths
People from the Duchy of Bukovina
Bukovina-German people
German people of Austrian descent
Condor Legion personnel
German World War II flying aces
German military personnel of the Spanish Civil War
Recipients of the Gold German Cross